Alex Newhook (born January 28, 2001) is a Canadian professional ice hockey center currently playing for the Colorado Avalanche of the National Hockey League (NHL). He was selected by the Avalanche in the first round, 16th overall, of the 2019 NHL Entry Draft. Newhook won the Stanley Cup with the Avalanche in 2022, becoming the third player from Newfoundland and Labrador to win the Stanley Cup, after Daniel Cleary and Michael Ryder.

Playing career
Newhook joined the Victoria Grizzlies of the British Columbia Hockey League (BCHL) for the 2017–18 season. He finished second in team scoring with 66 points in 45 games. Newhook also recorded nine points in 12 postseason games.

During the 2018–19 season, Newhook signed his Letter of Intent to join Boston College for the 2019–20 season. He led the league in scoring, recording 38 goals and 64 assists for 102 points in 53 games. Newhook won the Vern Dye Memorial Award as the league's most valuable player. He was also named the Canadian Junior Hockey League (CJHL) most valuable player. Following the season, Newhook was selected in the first round, 16th overall, by the Colorado Avalanche in the 2019 NHL Entry Draft.

Newhook had an impressive freshman campaign with the Boston College Eagles men's ice hockey, posting 19 goals and 23 assists for 42 points in 34 games. He led all Hockey East freshmen in points and goals, led all NCAA freshman in goals and tied for 7th in scoring among all NCAA skaters. He was named the Tim Taylor Award recipient, the first in Boston College history, as well as the Hockey East Rookie of the Year. He was also named a Hockey East Second Team All-Star and to the All-Rookie Team.

Newhook missed the start of his sophomore season at Boston College due to his participation in the 2021 World Juniors held in Edmonton, Alberta. Team Canada required their players to quarantine for a full two months ahead of the competition as they held training camp in Red Deer, Alberta. He helped team Canada earn a silver medal, falling in the gold medal game to rival United States and fellow Boston College linemate Matthew Boldy and teammate Spencer Knight.

After returning to campus, Newhook was injured in his season debut. His injury combined with early quarantine protocols resulted in Newhook appearing in only 12 games in total for the season, posting 7 goals and 16 points for the Eagles.

On March 31, 2021, Newhook ended his collegiate career by agreeing to a three-year, entry-level contract with the Colorado Avalanche. He was assigned by the Avalanche to begin his professional career with AHL affiliate, the Colorado Eagles. After producing at the AHL level, collecting 5 goals and 9 points through 8 games, Newhook was called up to the Avalanche's taxi squad on May 2, 2021. He made his NHL debut on May 5, 2021, in a Colorado Avalanche 3–2 loss to the San Jose Sharks.

International play

 

Newhook was selected to participate for Canada at the 2021 World Junior Championships in Edmonton, Alberta. He recorded 3 goals and 6 points at the tournament, helping Canada capture the silver medal.

Personal life
Alex Newhook was born to parents Paula and Shawn in St. John's, Newfoundland and Labrador, Canada. He began skating at the age of 4. Growing up, Newhook idolized fellow Newfoundlander and Stanley Cup champion Daniel Cleary, who he called "a guy that I watched growing up and dreamt of being like him when I grew up."

Newhook has a younger sister, Abby Newhook, who also plays hockey. In a questionnaire for the NHL, Newhook responded to the prompt "not a lot of people know that I..." with "have a sister who is better than me at hockey." Abby Newhook currently plays for two women's hockey teams—for the preparatory school Tabor Academy's team, and for the Bay State Breakers. Like her brother Alex, Abby Newhook is committed to play hockey at Boston College.

Career statistics

Regular season and playoffs

International

Awards and honours

References

External links
 

2001 births
Living people
Boston College Eagles men's ice hockey players
Canadian ice hockey centres
Colorado Avalanche draft picks
Colorado Avalanche players
Colorado Eagles players
Ice hockey people from Newfoundland and Labrador
National Hockey League first-round draft picks
Sportspeople from St. John's, Newfoundland and Labrador
Stanley Cup champions
Victoria Grizzlies players